The 2023 Colonial Athletic Association men's basketball tournament is the postseason men's college basketball tournament for the Colonial Athletic Association for the 2022–23 NCAA Division I men's basketball season. The tournament will be held March 3–7, 2023, at the Entertainment and Sports Arena in Washington, D.C.. The winner will receive the conference's automatic bid to the 2023 NCAA tournament.

Seeds

Schedule

Bracket

* denotes overtime game

See also
 2023 CAA women's basketball tournament

References

External links

Colonial Athletic Association men's basketball tournament
Tournament
College basketball tournaments in Washington, D.C.
CAA men's basketball tournament
CAA men's basketball tournament